Philippe Da Costa (born December 7, 1962) served as the President of the World Scout Committee and as the Commissaire général (General Commissioner) of the Scouts de France from 1995 to 2002. He is currently the national president of the French Red Cross and a member of the Economic, Social and Environmental Council. In May 2008, he was appointed President of the National Institute of Youth and Popular Education (INJEP).

Background
Da Costa was elected member of the World Scout Committee for a term of 6 years. His election was held in July 2002 at the Thessaloniki World Scout Conference. He was elected Vice-President at the World Scout Conference in Tunisia in September 2005. He became President of the World Scout Committee on 1 March 2008 following the resignation of Herman Hui. His term ended in July 2008 on the island of Jeju in Korea.

The World Scout Committee appointed Da Costa to serve as a liaison to the external Scout body World Scout Parliamentary Union.

In 2010, he was awarded the 322nd Bronze Wolf, the only distinction of the World Organization of the Scout Movement, awarded by the World Scout Committee for exceptional services to world Scouting.

Da Costa is a Doctor of Social Sciences, married and father of three daughters.

References

External links

Recipients of the Bronze Wolf Award
Scouting and Guiding in France
1962 births
Living people